Pragathi Mahavadi (born April 17, 1975) is Indian film and television actress who has acted in Telugu, Tamil, and Malayalam languages.

Personal life
Pragathi was born in Ongole, Andhra Pradesh.

Career
Pragathi started her career as a model for Mysore Silk Palace. Later, she was introduced by Bhagyaraj as a lead actress in Veetla Visheshanga. At the time, she acted in seven Tamil films and one Malayalam film. She got married and three years after she returned to act in television serials.

Partial filmography

Telugu 

 Shabash Ramu (1993)
 Bobby (2002)
 Nuvve Nuvve (2002)
 Nuvvu Leka Nenu Lenu (2002)
 Gangotri (2003)
 Samba (2004)
 Leela Mahal Center (2004)
 Kushi Kushiga (2004)
 Yamagola Malli Modalayindi (2007)
 Chirutha (2007)
 Lakshyam (2007)
 Athidhi (2007)
 Pourudu (2008)
 Ready (2008)
 Chintakayala Ravi (2008)
 Kurradu (2009)
 Kalavaramaye Madilo (2009)
 Namo Venkatesa (2010)
 Seeta Ramula Kalyanam (2010)
 Sadhyam (2010)
 Rama Rama Krishna Krishna (2010)
 Andari Banduvaya (2010)
 Jhummandi Naadam (2010)
 Em Pillo Em Pillado (2010)
 Brindaavanam (2010)
 Yemaindi Ee Vela (2010)
 Chalaki (2010)
 Kalavar King (2010)
 Taj Mahal (2010)
 Rakta Charitra/ Rakta Charitra 2 (2011 - Bilingual)
 Ala Modalaindi (2011)
 Shakti (2011)
 Teen Maar (2011)
 Mr. Perfect (2011)
 Badrinath (2011)
 Kandireega (2011)
 Daggaraga Dooramga (2011)
 Dookudu (2011)
 It's My LoveStory (2011)
 Priyudu (2011)
 Veera (2011)
 Vastadu Naa Raju (2011)
 Aakasame Haddu (2011)
 Andala Rakshasi (2012)
 Bodyguard (2012)
 Nippu (2012)
 Poola Rangadu (2012)
 Dhoni (2012)
 Naa Ishtam (2012)
 Rachcha (2012)
 All the Best (2012)
 Julayi (2012)
 Dhenikaina Ready (2012)
 Damarukam (2012)
 Jabardasth (2013)
 Baadshah (2013)
 Priyathama Neevachata Kushalama (2013)
 Chukkalanti Ammayi Chakkanaina Abbayi (2013)
 Anthaka Mundu Aa Tarvatha (2013)
 Backbench Student (2013)
 Ramayya Vasthavayya (2013)
 Dalam (2013)
 Iddarammayilatho (2013)
 Dillunnodu (2013)
 Pantham (2013)
 Rudrakshapalli (2013)
 Race Gurram (2014)
 Prathinidhi (2014)
 Power (2014)
 Rabhasa (2014)
 Loukyam (2014)
 Lakshmi Raave Maa Intiki (2014)
 Govindudu Andarivadele (2014)
 Romeo (2014)
 Oka Laila Kosam (2014)
 Dongata (2015)
 Krishnamma Kalipindi Iddarini (2015)
 Kerintha (2015)
 Subramanyam For Sale (2015)
 Bengal Tiger (2015)
 Soukhyam (2015)
 Speedunnodu (2016)
 Abbayitho Ammayi (2016)
 Nenu Sailaja (2016)
 Malupu (2016)
 Kalyana Vaibhogame (2016)
 Gentleman (2016)
 Oka Manasu (2016)
 Srirastu Subhamastu (2016)
 Shankara (2016)
 Intlo Deyyam Nakem Bhayam (2016)
 Radha (2017)
 Oye Ninne (2017)
 Chalo (2018)
 Awe! (2018)
 Chal Mohan Ranga (2018)
 Vijetha (2018)
 F2 - Fun and Frustration (2019)
 Oh! Baby (2019)
 Marshal (2019)
 Arjun Suravaram (2019)
 90ML (2019)
 Maa Vintha Gadha Vinuma (2020)
  Most Eligible Bachelor (2021)
 Super Machi (2022)
 DJ Tillu (2022)
 F3 (2022)
 Ranga Ranga Vaibhavanga (2022)
 GodFather (2022)
 Swathi Muthyam (2022)
 Bhola Shankar (2022)

Tamil

 Veetla Visheshanga (1994)
 Periya Marudhu (1994)
 Pandiyanin Raajyathil (1994)
 Summa Irunga Machan (1996)
 Vaazhga Jananayagam (1996)
 Pudhalvan (1997)
 Jayam (2003)
 Silambattam (2008)
 Anthony Yaar? (2009)
 Oliyum Oliyum (2009)
 Thairiyam (2010)
 Siddhu +2 (2010)
 Sabash Sariyana Potti (2011)
 Eththan (2011)
 Markandeyan (2011)
 Dhoni (2012)
 Ishtam (2012)
 Yagavarayinum Naa Kaakka (2015)
 Inimey Ippadithan (2015)
 Gethu (2016)
 Tharai Thappattai (2016)
 Vanakkam Da Mappilei (2021)
 Bagheera (2023)

Malayalam 
 Keerthanam (1995)
 Mazhamegha Pravukal (2001)

Television

Awards

References

External links
 
 

Living people
Actresses in Telugu cinema
Indian film actresses
20th-century Indian actresses
21st-century Indian actresses
Actresses from Hyderabad, India
Actresses in Malayalam cinema
Actresses in Tamil cinema
1977 births
Actresses in Tamil television
Actresses in Telugu television
Actresses in Malayalam television